Joseph Erwin Jacoby (born July 6, 1959) is a former American football offensive tackle. He played for the Washington Redskins of the National Football League (NFL), where he won three Super Bowls during his tenure with the team.

College career
Jacoby started off as an offensive tackle for the University of Louisville from 1978 to 1980.  He was a three-year letterman, and the team co-captain in his senior season.  Jacoby was inducted into Louisville's Athletic Hall of Fame in 2004.  Still, the team achieved limited success with Jacoby, posting a 16-16 overall record in his three seasons, with only one season with a winning record and no Bowl game appearances.

Professional career
After college, Jacoby went undrafted. He signed a free agent contract with the Washington Redskins in 1981, where he embarked on an enviable career—four Super Bowl appearances, of which his team won three (XVII in 1983, XXII in 1988, and XXVI in 1992), plus four consecutive Pro Bowl selections from 1983 to 1986.

Along with Jeff Bostic, Mark May, George Starke and Russ Grimm, Jacoby was a founding member of the Redskins' renowned "Hogs" offensive line of the 1980s and early 1990s (deemed one of the best front fives of NFL history), which was a mainstay of the Redskins' glory years during the first Joe Gibbs era.

Jacoby was the lead blocker on John Riggins' famous touchdown run which ensured the Redskins' Super Bowl XVII win over the Dolphins in 1983. In that game, the Redskins set a Super Bowl record for most rushing yards with 276.  The Hogs helped the Redskins break that record five years later in Super Bowl XXII, in which Washington trampled over the Denver Broncos with 280 rushing yards en route to the second of the Redskins' three championships.

Personal
One year after the Redskins' third Super Bowl victory in 1992, Jacoby retired, after which he became the owner of an auto dealership in Warrenton, Virginia.

Jacoby became an assistant football coach at Shenandoah University in Winchester, Virginia. He began as a part-time volunteer in 2008 and was hired as a full-time employee in 2009. In 2014, Jacoby was hired as the offensive line coach for Concordia University Chicago.

Jacoby has a wife, Irene, and two daughters.

References

1959 births
Living people
American football offensive tackles
Concordia Cougars football coaches
Louisville Cardinals football players
Shenandoah Hornets football coaches
Washington Redskins players
National Conference Pro Bowl players
Players of American football from Louisville, Kentucky
Sportspeople from Louisville, Kentucky
Western High School (Louisville, Kentucky) alumni
Ed Block Courage Award recipients